The Philip C. Jessup International Law Moot Court Competition, also known as the Jessup Moot or The Jessup, is the oldest and largest international moot competition in the world, attracting participants from almost 700 law schools in more than 90 countries in recent years (100 countries took part in 2018).  The competition has been described as the most prestigious moot court competition in the world by a large number of organisations and universities internationally, and is one of the grand slam or major moots.

Origins of the moot

The competition is a simulation of a fictional dispute between countries before the International Court of Justice (ICJ). It is named after Philip Jessup, who once served on the ICJ, and is organised by the International Law Students Association (ILSA). The moot, under the leadership of Stephen Schwebel (who also wrote the inaugural moot problem), started as a friendly advocacy competition between two teams from Harvard University in 1960. The first champions were declared in 1963 and the competition opened its doors to non-American teams in 1968.

Moot format

The Jessup moot involves arguing a hypothetical case on issues of international law as if before the ICJ, but with a smaller complement of judges (three instead of 15). The ILSA Board is responsible for soliciting and selecting proposals for the compromis every year.

Each team comprises two to five student members. Each team must prepare to argue both Applicant and Respondent, and must produce a written memorial for each side. In each oral round, two competitors from a team will argue one side of the case for 45 minutes in total, including any time reserved for rebuttal or sur-rebuttal. A third team member may be seated at the bar table as of-counsel, but may not present argument. Some teams dedicate two oralists to each side of the argument, with the fifth person serving a more open-ended role. In other teams, only two or three speakers will present oral argument, with at least one person arguing both Applicant and Respondent sides. In addition, most teams include at least one advisor or coach, usually drawn from the respective universities' international law faculty and/or past Jessup competitors.

Most countries hold national or regional rounds to select the best team or teams to advance to the international phase of the competition in Washington D.C., which is held in conjunction with the annual meeting of the American Society of International Law. Generally, each country can only send one school for every ten law schools that participate in the moot. For instance, the United States, which has more than a hundred law schools taking part each year, is represented by up to 12 teams following the conclusion of its six regional rounds, while smaller countries that have only a small number of law schools can only send one team. Domestic round administrators have some autonomy in setting their own rules. In recent years, around 700 schools worldwide participate in the competition, with the top 140 or so qualifying for the international rounds in Washington, D.C. Teams that do not qualify may be invited to participate in exhibition rounds.

In Washington D.C., teams compete in four preliminary rounds, with the top 32 teams advancing to the knockout stages (round of 32, octo-final, quarter-final, semi-Final, and final); this number changed to 40 from 2020 onwards, with the top 24 advancing to the round of 32 directly and the next 16 teams participating in a run-off. Each oral round and memorial is usually evaluated by a panel of three judges, and memorials are re-assessed for knockout and award purposes. Judges for most of the rounds in Washington, D.C. are usually practicing lawyers or academics, while notable academics and international judges are usually invited to judge the Semi-Final and Final round matches.

The Covid-19 pandemic led to the cancellation of the oral rounds for the first time. For the 2021 edition, the oral rounds went fully online using the Yaatly platform, and all teams were allowed to participate regardless of the outcome of any national or regional round, and teams could moot seated. The top 168 out of 548 teams from the first four preliminary matches proceeded to compete in four additional advanced rounds, from which the top 48 teams competed in the knockout stages, with the top 16 seeds receiving a bye to the round of 32. In a departure from past practice, the choice of side was determined by the organisers rather than the higher-ranked team. The international rounds of the 2022 edition remained fully online, but with a reversion of the knockout format. The 2023 edition of the international rounds will see a return to the in-person format.

Past winners and records (international rounds)
Although the moot was founded in 1960, no winners were declared for the first three editions of the competition. The competition was only first open to countries outside the United States in 1968, and outside of North America in 1970. The first international awards were handed out in 1972.

Pre-international era (1960 to 1967)

International era (1968 to present)

Track record (international rounds) 
The University of Sydney has won the most number of championships, winning the Jessup Cup six times (with the sixth title won in 2021, which were conducted online due to COVID-19). National University of Singapore has the second best record (four times champions; eight times runner-up) and also the most Baxter Awards (five), Evans Awards (four), Best Oralist titles (four), and Best Finals Oralist titles (seven). Five law schools have made the final on their international debuts: Australian National University (1981); Dalhousie University (1984); University of Saskatchewan (1991); University of Western Australia (1995); and Singapore Management University (2013). Of these schools, ANU, Dalhousie, and Saskatchewan won their finals. SMU is the fastest ever law school to reach the international final relative to its debut in the competition (2011), and is also the youngest ever law school to reach the international final (the first batch graduated in 2011) and back-to-back international finals (2013 and 2014).

University (1968 to 2022)

Country (1968 to 2022)

Notable former participants
 Ang Cheng Hock (1995, National University of Singapore) – Senior Counsel and High Court Judge of Supreme Court of Singapore
 Lucas Bastin (2007, University of Sydney) – Queen's Counsel
 Hilary Charlesworth (1980, University of Melbourne) – Professor of international law and Judge of the International Court of Justice
 Steven Chong (1982, National University of Singapore) – Senior Counsel, Attorney-General of Singapore, and Judge of Appeal of Supreme Court of Singapore
 Peta Credlin (1995, University of Melbourne) – Chief of Staff to former Australian Prime Minister Tony Abbott
 Francisco Domenech (2002, University of Puerto Rico) – Director of the Office of Legislative Services of Puerto Rico
 James Edelman (1996, University of Western Australia) – University of Oxford Professor and Justice of the High Court of Australia
 Sundaresh Menon (1986, National University of Singapore) – Senior Counsel, Attorney-General of Singapore, and Chief Justice of Singapore
 S. Muralidhar (1984, Madras Law College) – Judge of High Court of Punjab and Haryana
 Georg Nolte (1984 Free University of Berlin) – Professor of international law and judge of the International Court of Justice
 Bruce Poole (1984, Washington and Lee) – Chairman of the Maryland Democratic Party
 Judith Prakash (1974, National University of Singapore) – Judge of Appeal of Supreme Court of Singapore
 V.K. Rajah (1982, National University of Singapore) – Senior Counsel, Judge of Appeal of Supreme Court of Singapore, and Attorney-General of Singapore
 Indranee Rajah (1986, National University of Singapore) – Senior Counsel and Minister in Prime Minister's Office of Singapore
 Marco Rubio (1995, University of Miami Law School) – US Senator from Florida and 2016 US presidential candidate
 Dipen Sabharwal (1999, National Law School of India University) – Queen's Counsel
 K. Shanmugam (1984, National University of Singapore) – Senior Counsel and Minister for Law and Home Affairs, Singapore
 Davinder Singh (1982, National University of Singapore) – Senior Counsel and former CEO of Drew & Napier
 Brad Smith (1984, Columbia University) – President and Chief Legal Officer of Microsoft
 Lucien Wong (1977, National University of Singapore) – Attorney-General of Singapore
 Woo Bih Li (1977, National University of Singapore) – Senior Counsel and High Court Judge of Supreme Court of Singapore

Cultural impact
In 2013, White & Case commissioned a 95-minute documentary, All Rise, which followed the Jessup journeys of seven teams around the world; the film made its world premiere at Doc NYC.

Notes and references

External links
 The Philip C. Jessup International Law Moot Court Competition registration and schedule
 ICJ Presidents H.E. Rosalyn Higgins and H.E. Stephen M. Schwebel at the ILSA-ASIL Gala Dinner Celebrating the 50th Anniversary of the Philip C. Jessup International Law Moot Court Competition on 27 March 2009 and Jessup's 50th Anniversary Honorary Committee and 50th Jessup Video and 50th Jessup Programme and Prize for "Best Jessup Oralist" Launched in Honour of Former ICJ President Stephen M. Schwebel at [https://web.archive.org/web/20090310214600/http://am2009.asil.org/index.cfm the 103rd ASIL Annual Meeting on International Law as Law, Held in Fairmont Hotel, Washington, D.C., 25–28 March 2009

International law
Moot court competitions